Jan "JD" Derbyshire is a Canadian theatre artist, comedian, and writer. She has performed her one-woman show, Certified, across Canada, including in Vancouver where it won two Jessie Richardson Theatre Awards.

Early life and education 
Derbyshire was born and raised in Calgary, Alberta. She completed master's degree from the Ontario College of Art and Design in Inclusive Design in 2014.

Career 
In 2010 alongside the Paralympic Games, Derbyshire performed her one-woman show Funny in the Head at the Kickstart Disability Arts and Culture Festival. Funny in the Head, a show about Derbyshire's experiences with bipolar disorder, was the only show performed at Kickstart.

Derbyshire developed the one-woman show, Certified, in 2018. She has performed Certified for Handsome Alice Theatre (Calgary) in 2018, Touchstone Theatre (Vancouver) in 2019, at One Yellow Rabbit's High Performance Rodeo (Calgary) in 2020, and at the Progress Festival (Toronto) in 2020.

In 2020, Derbyshire was writer-in-residence at Mount Royal University.

Personal life 
Derbyshire and her ex-husband, TV director Michael Rohl, have a daughter, actress Kacey Rohl.

Plays 

 Labour Unions, the Brotherhood of Mothers
 Freaky Jane Fine Takes on the Serious World
 Bearded Circus Ladies
 Ingenius Speculations  co-written with Kim Selody, Rita Bozi, and Roy Surette
 Joke You
 Maharani and the Maple Leaf
 Under the Big Top
 All In
 Funny in the Head
 Turkey in the Woods
 Sorry Toronto, Really I Am
 Certified

Awards

References 

OCAD University alumni
Canadian women dramatists and playwrights
Canadian women comedians
Living people
Writers from Calgary
20th-century Canadian dramatists and playwrights
21st-century Canadian dramatists and playwrights
Date of birth missing (living people)
Year of birth missing (living people)
Comedians from Alberta
20th-century Canadian women writers